The women's mass start competition at the Biathlon World Championships 2019 was held on 17 March 2019.

Results
The race was started at 13:15.

References

Women's mass start